The 2007 Naisten Liiga, part of the 2007 Finnish football season, was the first season of the 2006 established Naisten Liiga. FC Honka were the defending Finnish champions, having won the 2006 Naisten SM-sarja (The Championship Series) season.

Teams

Preliminary stage

Championship group 
Note: Matches and points of Preliminary stage are counted

Relegation group 
Note: Matches and points of Preliminary stage are counted

Top scorers

Personal awards 
Top scorer: Taru Laihanen, FC Honka
Player of the year: Eveliina Sarapää, FC Honka
Referee of the year: Kirsi Heikkinen

Sources 
Finland - List of Women League First Level Tables Rec.Sport.Soccer Statistics Foundation
Top scorers 2006-12 Naisten Liiga (in Finnish)

External links 
Naisten Liiga Official Homepage (in Finnish)

Kansallinen Liiga seasons
Naisten
Finland
Finland